"The Timeless Children" is the tenth and final episode of the twelfth series of the British science fiction television programme Doctor Who, first broadcast on BBC One on 1 March 2020. It was written by Chris Chibnall, and directed by Jamie Magnus Stone. It is the second of a two-part story; the previous episode, "Ascension of the Cybermen", aired on 23 February.

The episode stars Jodie Whittaker as the Thirteenth Doctor, alongside Bradley Walsh, Tosin Cole, and Mandip Gill as her companions, Graham O'Brien, Ryan Sinclair and Yasmin Khan, respectively. The episode also stars Sacha Dhawan as The Master.

The episode was watched by 4.69 million viewers.  It received mixed reviews, with a 71% approval and 6.33/10 critical rating at Rotten Tomatoes, but with poor reviews from some critics and fans alike, most notably due to its central controversial continuity change, which established the Doctor as "the timeless child".

Plot 
The Master persuades the Doctor to join him on Gallifrey, where he forces her to enter the Matrix. He shows her the secret history of Gallifrey and its native Shobogans. Tecteun, a space explorer, found a "timeless child" with the capacity to regenerate. She adopted the child and studied her, successfully grafting her regeneration capacity into the Shobogans, transforming them into Time Lords; they chose to limit a Time Lord's regenerations to twelve. The Master reveals that the Doctor is the "timeless child". Tecteun and the child were inducted into a clandestine organisation called the Division, the details of which were redacted from the Matrix. The Doctor's memories were subsequently erased, prior to the childhood she remembers; only snippets remain, masked as the story of the Irish Garda Brendan.

With the Doctor trapped in the Matrix, the Master lures Ashad to Gallifrey and shrinks him with his tissue compression eliminator, taking the Cyberium. With its knowledge and the bodies of the Time Lords he had killed on his arrival to Gallifrey, the Master creates a race of regenerating Cybermen, aiming to use them to take over the universe. In the Matrix, a vision of the Fugitive Doctor restores the Doctor’s belief in herself. The Doctor escapes by overloading the Matrix with all of her memories from her past incarnations.

On board the Cyber-carrier, Bescot is killed, while Yaz and Graham successfully hide from the invading Cybermen in empty Cyber-armor. They subsequently save the lives of Ryan, Ethan, and Ko Sharmus from Cybermen forces sent to the planet by Ashad. The group gather and agree to go through the portal to Gallifrey.

The Doctor regroups with her companions, and discovers Ashad's miniaturized body contains a "Death Particle" capable of destroying all organic life on a planet. The Doctor and her friends blow up the Cyber-carrier, destroying Ashad's army in the process and foiling his plot to rebuild the Cyber-Empire. Finding unused TARDISes, she programs one to take her allies home. The Doctor takes one of Ko Sharmus' explosives to set off the particle. She is unable to trigger it when goaded by the Master, but Ko Sharmus appears and takes it, as penance for failing to suitably hide the Cyberium. The Doctor escapes in another TARDIS as the explosion consumes Gallifrey.

The Doctor's allies arrive on contemporary Earth in their TARDIS. The Doctor lands the other TARDIS near her own, but as she prepares to take off, she is arrested by the Judoon and teleported to a prison located inside an asteroid.

Continuity
As the Doctor broadcasts her memories to escape the Matrix, the show uses numerous scenes from both the new series and the old, featuring each Doctor, several companions, and villains. Notably the flashback includes images from The Brain of Morbius, a Fourth Doctor serial. In that story, while the Doctor and Morbius are hooked to a machine during a battle of wits, the machine briefly flashed up the former regenerations of the Doctor and several additional faces, implied to be incarnations that precede the First Doctor. This scene from The Brain of Morbius is shown during the Doctor's flashback in this episode, identifying these figures as incarnations of the Timeless Child.

Production

Development 
"The Timeless Children" was written by Chris Chibnall. Further episode details were announced in Doctor Who Magazine #548 in early February 2020.

Casting 

Julie Graham was cast as Ravio in the episode. Ian McElhinney and Steve Toussaint were announced as guest stars in the two-part finale, "Ascension of the Cybermen" / "The Timeless Children"; however, Toussaint did not appear in this episode after his character was killed in the events of "Ascension of the Cybermen". Jo Martin reprises her role from "Fugitive of the Judoon" as an incarnation of the Doctor.

Filming 
Jamie Magnus Stone directed the fifth block, consisting of the ninth and tenth episodes.

Broadcast and reception

Television 
"The Timeless Children" aired on 1 March 2020. It is the second of a two-part story; the previous episode, "Ascension of the Cybermen", aired on 23 February.

Ratings 
"The Timeless Children" was watched by 3.78 million viewers overnight, making it the seventh most watched programme for the day in the United Kingdom. The episode had an Audience Appreciation Index score of 82. The episode received an official total of 4.69 million viewers across all UK channels and was the 30th most-watched programme of the week. It was the lowest-rated episode of the show since its revival in 2005 after "The Eaters of Light" in 2017.

Critical reception 
The episode received a 71% approval, and an average rating of 6.33/10, on the review aggregate site Rotten Tomatoes, based on 14 reviews from critics. The consensus on the website reads, "Its relentless plotting and exposition teeter on overwhelming, but a bold daringness to reinvent Whovian lore coupled with Jodie Whittaker's dynamic performance make 'The Timeless Children' a successful season finale." Patrick Mulkern of Radio Times expressed various criticisms of the episode, even attacking its cliffhanger ending. Andrew Cartmel, a former Doctor Who script editor during the 1980s, commented negatively on Chibnall’s writing, believing the episode "depletes the mystery" of Doctor Who.

References

External links 

 
 
 

2020 British television episodes
Cybermen television stories
Doctor Who multi-Doctor stories
The Master (Doctor Who) television stories
Thirteenth Doctor episodes